Belgium participated in the Eurovision Song Contest 2002 with the song "Sister" written by Dirk Paelinck and Marc Paelinck. The song was performed by the group Sergio and the Ladies. The Belgian entry for the 2002 contest in Tallinn, Estonia was selected through the national final Eurosong 2002, organised by the Flemish broadcaster Vlaamse Radio- en Televisieomroeporganisatie (VRT). VRT returned to the Eurovision Song Contest after a one-year absence following their relegation from 2001 as one of the bottom six countries in the 2000 contest. The competition featured twenty-eight competing entries and consisted of five shows. In the final on 17 February 2002, "Sister" performed by Sergio @ the Ladies was selected as the winner via the votes of five voting groups. The group was renamed as Sergio and the Ladies for the Eurovision Song Contest.

Belgium competed in the Eurovision Song Contest which took place on 25 May 2002. Performing during the show in position 16, Belgium placed thirteenth out of the 24 participating countries, scoring 33 points.

Background

In 2000, Nathalie Sorce represented the country with the song "Envie de vivre" and placed twenty-fourth (last).

The Belgian broadcaster for the 2002 contest, who broadcasts the event in Belgium and organises the selection process for its entry, was Vlaamse Radio- en Televisieomroeporganisatie (VRT). The Belgian participation in the contest alternates between two broadcasters: the Flemish VRT and the Walloon Radio Télévision Belge de la Communauté Française (RTBF). Both broadcasters have selected the Belgian entry using national finals and internal selections in the past. In 1999 and 2000, both VRT and RTBF organised a national final in order to select the Belgian entry. On 6 June 2001, VRT confirmed Belgium's participation in the 2002 Eurovision Song Contest and announced that the Eurosong national final would be held to select their entry.

Before Eurovision

Eurosong 2002 
Eurosong 2002 was the national final that selected Belgium's entry in the Eurovision Song Contest 2002. The competition consisted of five shows that commenced on 20 January 2002 and concluded with a final on 17 February 2002 where the winning song and artist were selected. All shows took place at the Studio 100 in Schelle, hosted by Bart Peeters and broadcast on TV1.

Format 
Twenty-eight entries were selected to compete in Eurosong. Four semi-finals took place on 20 January 2002, 27 January 2002, 3 February 2002 and 10 February 2002 with each show featuring seven entries. The winner of each semi-final qualified to the final, and the three highest scoring second placed acts in the semi-finals were also selected to advance. The final took place on 17 February 2002 where the winner was chosen. The results of all shows were determined by an expert jury, an international jury consisting of members from the participating countries at the Eurovision Song Contest 2002, voting on Radio 2 and Radio Donna and public televoting. Each voting group had an equal stake in the result during all shows with the exception of the public televote which had a weighting equal to the votes of two groups. For the radio voting, listeners of the two stations was able to vote in advance prior to each of the five shows via televoting between Tuesday and Friday and their votes were combined with a jury consisting of representatives from the respective stations.

During each of the five shows, the expert jury provided commentary and feedback to the artists as well as selected entries to advance in the competition. The experts were:

 Andrea Croonenberghs – actress and singer
 Annemie Ramaekers – journalist at Het Laatste Nieuws
 Bart Alleman – Head of Entertainment at Dag Allemaal
 Ilse Ceulemans – journalist at Story
 Marcel Vanthilt – singer and television presenter
 Rocco Granata – singer-songwriter
 Koen Lauwereyns – editor at Het Volk and Het Nieuwsblad

Competing entries
A submission period was opened on 6 June 2001 for artists and songwriters to submit their entries until 31 October 2001. The twenty-eight acts selected for the competition from 351 entries received during the submission period were announced on 3 December 2001.

Shows

Semi-finals 
The four semi-finals took place on 20 January, 27 January, 3 February and 10 February 2002. In each show seven entries competed and the combination of results from two jury groups, two radio voting groups and a public televote determined the winner that qualified to the final. The three highest scoring second placed acts in the semi-finals also proceeded to the final.

Final 
The final took place on 17 February 2002 where the seven entries that qualified from the preceding four semi-finals competed. The winner, "Sister" performed by Sergio @ the Ladies, was selected by the combination of results from two jury groups, two radio voting groups and a public televote. "Sister" received 67% of the 330,000 televotes registered during the show.

Ratings

At Eurovision
According to Eurovision rules, all nations with the exceptions of the bottom six countries in the 2001 contest competed in the final. On 9 November 2001, a special allocation draw was held which determined the running order and Belgium was set to perform in position 16, following the entry from Bosnia and Herzegovina and before the entry from France. The group performed at the contest under the new name Sergio and the Ladies, and Belgium finished in thirteenth place with 33 points.

The contest was broadcast in Belgium by both the Flemish and Walloon broadcasters. VRT broadcast the show on TV1 with commentary in Dutch by André Vermeulen and Bart Peeters. RTBF televised the shows on La Une with commentary in French by Jean-Pierre Hautier. The show was also broadcast by VRT on Radio 2 with commentary in Dutch by Julien Put and Michel Follet, and by RTBF on La Première with commentary in French by Laurent Daube and Éric Russon. The Belgian spokesperson, who announced the Belgian votes during the final, was Geena Lisa Peeters.

Voting
Below is a breakdown of points awarded to Belgium and awarded by Belgium in the contest. The nation awarded its 12 points to Spain in the contest.

References

External links
 Belgian National Final page

2002
Countries in the Eurovision Song Contest 2002
Eurovision